Arbab is a Persian word that means "boss", "master" and "landlord" or "one endowed with a special quality". It was a title used by tribal leaders in Middle East and South Asia.

Persian-language surnames
Titles in Pakistan
Landlords